Game Theory is the seventh studio album by American hip hop band The Roots, released August 29, 2006, on Def Jam Recordings. The group's first release for the label after leaving Geffen Records, the album was recorded by the Roots mostly using the Apple-developed software application GarageBand. A darker, grittier album with minimal emphasis on hooks in comparison to their previous work, Game Theory features a stripped-down sound similar to the work of Public Enemy, with lyrics that concern sociological themes and the late hip hop producer J Dilla.

The album debuted at number nine on the U.S. Billboard 200 chart, selling 61,000 copies in its first week. It produced two singles and achieved moderate sales success. Upon its release, Game Theory received acclaim from most music critics and earned a Grammy Award nomination for Best Rap Album. To date, the album has sold over 200,000 copies in the United States.

Music
In an interview for Rolling Stone magazine, Questlove expressed his view on contemporary black music and described the concept of Game Theory, comparing it to previous works:

Described by Questlove as "very mature, serious, and very dark", the album, unlike the band's previous two efforts Phrenology (2002) and The Tipping Point (2004), combines The Roots's progressive tendencies and lush, jazz influenced hip-hop into a more homogenous and cohesive recording than past efforts had shown. In what could be a salute to a fellow experimental band, The Roots sample Radiohead's "You and Whose Army?" for the track "Atonement".

The subject material for Game Theory follows the more serious tone of the album, with topics ranging from the war in Iraq to violence in music. Questlove was quoted as saying "There was too much going on that we couldn’t just sit back and not speak on it." In accordance with its more-serious tone, the album heavily references Public Enemy's highly-political It Takes a Nation of Millions to Hold Us Back on its lead track "False Media".

Commercial performance
Game Theory debuted at number nine on the U.S. Billboard 200 chart with first week sales of 61,000 copies. It also debuted at number five on Billboards Top R&B/Hip-Hop Albums and at number four on its Top Digital Albums chart. According to Nielsen SoundScan, the album has sold over 200,000 copies in the United States.

Critical reception 

Game Theory received universal acclaim from music critics. At Metacritic, which assigns a normalized rating out of 100 to reviews from mainstream critics, the album received an average score of 83, based on 26 reviews. AllMusic's Andy Kellman praised its musical quality and lyrical themes, writing "Spinning turbulence, paranoia, anger, and pain into some of the most exhilarating and startling music released in 2006,... Game Theory is a heavy album, the Roots' sharpest work. It's destined to become one of Def Jam's proudest, if not most popular, moments". The New York Times writer Nate Chinen viewed the album's production as inconsistent, but found Black Thought's performance more focused and engaged than on previous efforts, while writing that "?uestlove infuses Game Theory with a hard sonic logic, so that the music often sounds as tough as the lyrics". Vibes Thomas Golianopoulos gave it 4 out of 5 stars and called it "a masterfully crafted, sobering wake-up call". Jeff Vrabel of PopMatters dubbed it "The Roots' darkest, grimiest, most unrelenting and possibly most focused effort to date".

Los Angeles Times writer Oliver Wang commented that Game Theory "moves coherently as a whole and not just assemblage of spare songs". Rolling Stones Peter Relic viewed the album as a progression over their previous work and wrote "For every head-nodding beat (and ?uestlove brings plenty of 'em), Game Theory has a head-turning treat". Will Dukes of The Village Voice called it The Roots' "most radical record to date" and commended Black Thought for his lyricism on the album, writing "Raw, emotive, and urgent as a motherfucker, his flow—on songs like opener 'False Media,' whose gangly steel snares give way to plush orchestration—is bleak and expansive and seething with wrath". Robert Christgau, writing for MSN Music, felt that the album is "not hooky enough", but "strong enough to compensate" with a tone that "maintains until the J. Dilla encomium that closes."

In its end-of-year list, Rolling Stone named it the eighteenth best album of 2006, calling it "classic studio Roots". It was named one of the top ten albums of the year by URB. The album was nominated for a Grammy Award for Best Rap Album, ultimately losing to rapper Ludacris's Release Therapy (2006) at the 49th Grammy Awards.

In 2013, for Complex, the singer Bilal named it among his 25 favorite albums, explaining that, "It just has a real nice flow. That whole album just sounds very thought out and put together. I think Game Theory was kind of a game changer. It just seemed like everything was fluid."

Track listing
Unless otherwise noted, Credits are adapted from the album’s Liner Notes

Sample credits
The intro track "Dillatastic Vol Won(derful)" used a sample of Slum Village's first album, Fantastic Vol.1's intro track, "Fantastic", which J Dilla produced. ("Fantastic" incorporates elements of the Herbie Hancock composition "You'll Know When You Get There", from VSOP.)
The track "False Media" contains interpolations of Public Enemy's "Don't Believe The Hype", written by Carlton Ridenhour, Eric Sadler & Hank Shocklee.
The track "Game Theory" contains a sample of Sly and the Family Stone's "Life of Fortune and Fame", written by Sylvester Stewart.
The track "Don't Feel Right" samples Kool & The Gang's "Jungle Boogie", and The Ohio Players's "Ecstasy", written by Walter "Junie" Morrison, Leroy "Sugarfoot" Bonner, Marshall "Rock" Jones, Andrew Noland, Gregory Allen Webster, Marvin "Merv" Pierce, Norman Napier & Ralph "Pee Wee" Middlebrooks.
The track "Long Time" contains an interpolation of "Trolling for Olives" written by Owen Biddle, Kevin Hanson & Darryl Robinson.
The track "Atonement" samples Radiohead's "You and Whose Army?"
The track "Can't Stop This" contains a sample of The Jackson 5's "All I Do Is Think of You", written by Brian Holland & Michael Lovesmith, and The Moments' "To You with Love".  This song's backing track is an extended version of J Dilla's "Time: The Donut of the Heart" from his third solo album Donuts.

Personnel

 Wadud Ahmad - additional vocals (2), spoken word voices (6)
 Black Thought – lead rap vocals (2-13)
 Jack Davey - additional vocals (12)
 Davis Barnett – viola
 Dice Raw - lead rap vocals (6-9), background vocals (6-7)
 Robert "LB" Dorsey – recording engineer (2, 4-5, 7-9, 13)
 Captain Kirk Douglas – guitar
 Russell Elevado – recording engineer (2, 5-6, 8-9), audio mixing (2, 7, 9, 13), pre-mixing (drums on 5)
 Larry Gold – string arrangements, string conductor, cello
 Jason Goldstein – audio mixing (3-4, 6, 8, 10-13)
 Kamal Gray – keyboards
 Kevin Hanson – producer
 Michael Heinzer - background vocals (7)
 Leonard "Hub" Hubbard – bass
 J Dilla - recording engineer (13)
 John-John - additional lead vocals (7, 10), background vocals (7)
 Gloria Justen – violin
 Dave Klutch – mastering
 Emma Kummrow – violin

 Jennie Lorenzo - cello
 Malik B. – lead rap vocals (3, 5, 8)
 Steve Mandel – recording engineer (1-2, 4, 7, 12-13), audio mixing (1)
 Mercedes Martinez - background vocals (6, 10-11)
 Khari Mateen – recording engineer (3, 10-11)
 John McGlinchey - recording engineer (7)
 Charles Parker – violin
 Peedi Peedi - additional rap vocals (9)
 Porno - additional vocals (5)
 Rahzel - human beatbox (6)
 The Roots – main performer
 Bunny Sigler - vocals sung by (9)
 Jon Smeltz – recording engineer (2-6, 8-13), audio mixing (5)
 Igor Szwec – violin
 Ahmir '?uestlove' Thompson – recording engineer, audio mixing (1), background vocals (7), drums
 Frank "Knuckles" Walker – percussion
 Maimouna Youssef - vocals sung by (4)

Chart history

References

External links 
 Game Theory at Discogs
 Game Theory at Metacritic

2006 albums
The Roots albums
Def Jam Recordings albums
Albums produced by J Dilla
Albums produced by Questlove
Albums recorded at Electric Lady Studios